Engineer diver may refer to:
A proposed postgraduate engineering qualification in underwater inspection of engineering structures.
Army engineer diver, a diver in the United States Army Engineering Corps.